Gaatchora is an Indian Bengali drama television series which premiered on 20 December 2021 on Star Jalsha. It is also available on the digital platform Disney+ Hotstar. The series is produced by Snigdha Basu and Sani Ghose Ray under the banner of Acropoliis Entertainment. It features an ensemble cast of Gourab Chatterjee, Solanki Roy, Anindya Chatterjee, Shreema Bhattacharjee, Riaz Laskar and Anushka Goswami in lead roles.

Plot 
The show opens up on the occasion of Bengal's famous Jagatdhatri Puja. The renowned diamond traders, the Singha Roys, celebrate জগদ্ধাত্রী Puja every year. This year, the responsibility of the whole decoration of the Puja has been given to Khori Bhattacharya, the second daughter of the Bhattacharyas. They are three sisters, living with their parents. Her mother wishes that someday her daughters would get married into a wealthy family. Therefore, Khori's mother plans to head to the Singha Roy mansion with her daughters, in excuse of Khori's artistic talent.

The Singha Roys on the other hand are a joint family. The trio brothers in the family are the ones, who are greatly loved by their grandparents. Kunal is the youngest son of the Singha Roys. He is an artist and very good at art. Rahul is the middle son. He is very casual in his life and so-called "Romeo" type. The eldest son of the Singha Roys is Riddhiman Singha Roy. He is the most loved among the trio. Being the eldest, he has taken up the responsibility of his family business.Ridhhiman and Khori soon meet,but both have a massive hatred towards each other. Are marriages actually planned in heaven?

Cast

Main
 Gourab Chatterjee as Riddhiman "Riddhi" Singha Roy  – A diamond businessman; Himanshu and Manjira's son; Kunal, Emon, Gublu and Mainak's cousin; Rahul and Kiara's adoptive cousin; Khori's husband. (2021–present) 
 Solanki Roy as
 Khori Bhattacharya Singha Roy – A gifted artist and painter; Chandra and Ahindra's second daughter; Dyuti and Boni's sister; Amit's cousin; Riddhi's wife. (2021–present)
 Isha Sen – A diamond businesswoman; Owner of Dee's Diamond. (in disguise)
 Shreema Bhattacharjee as Dyuti Bhattacharya Sengupta – A gold digger; Chandra and Ahindra's eldest daughter; Khori and Boni's sister; Amit's cousin; Rahul's wife; Rimjhim's step and adoptive mother(2021–present)
 Anindya Chatterjee as Rahul Sengupta – A playboy; Paromita and Param's son; Kiara's brother; Mainak's cousin; Riddhi, Kunal, Emon and Gublu's adoptive cousin; Dyuti's husband; Rimjhim's father.(2021–present)
 Riaz Laskar as Kunal Singha Roy – An artist; Sudhanshu and Madhuja's son; Emon's brother; Riddhi, Gublu and Mainak's cousin; Rahul's adoptive cousin; Boni's husband (2021–present)
 Anushka Goswami as Banhisikha "Boni" Bhattacharya Singha Roy – A police officer; Chandra and Ahindra's youngest daughter; Dyuti and Khori's sister; Amit's cousin; Kunal's wife (2021–present)

Recurring 
 Rajat Ganguly as Narendranath Singha Roy – Patriarch of Singha Roys'; Himanshu, Debanshu, Sudhanshu and Madhusree's father; Paromita's adoptive father; Riddhi, Kunal, Emon, Gublu and Mainak's grandfather; Rahul and Kiara's adoptive grandfather (2021–present)
 Anuradha Roy as Kumudini Singha Roy – Narendranath's wife; Himanshu, Debanshu, Sudhanshu and Madhusree's mother; Paromita's adoptive mother; Riddhi, Kunal, Emon, Gublu and Mainak's grandmother; Rahul and Kiara's adoptive grandmother (2021–present)
 June Malia as Manjira Singha Roy – Himanshu's wife; Riddhi's mother  (2021–present)
 Arindam Banerjee as Himanshu Singha Roy – Narendranath and Kumudini's eldest son; Debanshu, Sudhanshu and Madhusree's brother; Paromita's adoptive brother; Manjira's husband; Riddhi's father (2022)
 Arijit Chowdhury as Sudhanshu Singha Roy – Narendranath and Kumudini's youngest son; Himanshu, Debanshu and Madhusree's brother; Paromita's adoptive brother; Madhuja's husband; Kunal and Emon's father (2021–present)
 Sohini Sanyal as Madhuja Singha Roy – Sudhanshu's wife; Kunal and Emon's mother (2021–present)
 Kaushik Chakraborty as Debanshu Singha Roy – Narendranath and Kumudini's second son; Himanshu, Sudhanshu and Madhusree's brother; Paromita's adoptive brother; Debolina's husband; Mainak's father (2022–present)
 Rajashree Bhowmik as Debolina Sengupta Singha Roy – Param's sister; Debanshu's wife,; Mainak and Shaina's mother (2022-present)
 Shaon Dey as Madhusree Singha Roy Bose – Narendranath and Kumudini's daughter; Himanshu, Debanshu and Sudhanshu's sister; Paromita's adoptive sister; Proshun's wife; Gublu's mother (2021–present)
 Subhrajit Dutta as Proshun Bose – Madhusree's husband; Gublu's father (2022–present)
 Suchismita Chowdhury as Paromita Singha Roy Sengupta – Narendranath and Kumudini's adoptive daughter; Himanshu, Debanshu, Sudhanshu and Madhusree's adoptive sister; Param's estranged wife; Rahul and Kiara's mother (2021–present)
 Sanchari Mondal / Ankushree Maity Bhattacharjee as Kiara Sengupta – Paromita and Param's daughter; Rahul's sister; Mainak's cousin; Riddhi, Kunal, Emon and Gublu's adoptive cousin (2021–2022) / (2022–present)
 Shirsha Guhathakurta as Emon Singha Roy – Sudhanshu and Madhuja's daughter; Kunal's sister; Riddhi, Gublu and Mainak's cousin; Rahul and Kiara's adoptive cousin (2021–present)
 Aishik Mukherjee as Writwik "Gublu" Bose – Proshun and Madhusree's son; Riddhi, Kunal, Emon and Mainak's cousin; Rahul and Kiara's adoptive cousin (2021–present)
 Subhajit Kar as Dr. Mainak Singha Roy – Debanshu and Debolina's son; Shaina's brother; Riddhi, Rahul, Kunal, Emon, Kiara and Gublu's cousin; Isha's fiancée (2022-present)  
 Rana Mitra as Param Sengupta – Debolina's brother; Paromita's estranged husband; Rahul and Kiara's father (2022-present) 
 Tanuka Chatterjee as Chandra Bhattacharya – Ahindra's wife; Dyuti, Khori and Boni's mother (2021–present)
 Ratan Sarkhel as Ahindra Bhattacharya – Ashok's brother; Chandra's husband; Dyuti, Khori and Boni's father (2021–present)
 Moumita Chakraborty as Chandra's elder sister (2021- 2022)
 Unknown as Amit Bhattacharya – Ashok and Jethimaa's son; Dyuti, Khori and Boni's cousin (2022)
 Sonali Chakraborty as Mrs. Bhattacharya aka Jethimaa – Ashok's wife; Amit's mother (2021–2022)
 Phalguni Chatterjee / Shankar Debnath as Ashok Bhattacharya – A renowned artist; Ahindra's brother; Jethimaa's husband; Amit's father (2022-present)
 Ayush Adhikari as Rocket – Khori’s helper in their store  and Boni’s disciple (2021 – present)
 Jasmine Roy as Tani - Riddhi's childhood friend and well wisher (2022-present) 
 Piyali Sasmal as Vinita Lahiri – Rahul's ex-fiancée (2022)
 Sonalisa Das as Ayana Dutta – Kunal's friend since school life (2022)
 Sunanda Chakraborty as Shruti Biswas – A reporter and correspondent of daily news and top media channel; Rahul's former love-interest (2021–present)
 Kunal Banerjee as Inspector Soumya Chatterjee – Boni's Trainer and Mentor; Emon's love interest (2022-present)
 Bodhisatva Majumder as Bimal – Kumudini's childhood friend (2022-present)

Adaptations

Reception

In Popular Culture
The main character of the serial Khori overall look became very popular among the women. Khori's handloom saree with handwork design fabric blouse and with it, the look of subtle yet eye-catching silver jewellery was loved by the audience.Therefore, the demand for light silver jewellery like Khori is high.Girls are running clothes, saree, jewellery business at home in various pages and groups. If you go to those public groups, you will see the demand of 'Khori jewellery' in the comment box.From this, the audience has adopted the character, the story of the serial as well as the look of Khori. Following a character's overall look like this is really cool.Thus the new style statement of Bengal is "Khori Look".

TRP Ratings

References 
38. Gaatchora Serial Cast Name

External links 
 Gaatchora at Disney+ Hotstar

Star Jalsha original programming
2021 Indian television series debuts
Indian drama television series
Bengali-language television programming in India